Mukto is one of the 60 Legislative Assembly constituencies of Arunachal Pradesh state in India. It is reserved for candidates belonging to the ST and is part of Arunachal West Lok Sabha constituency along with 32 other Legislative Assembly segments.

Mukto is one of the 3 constituencies located in Tawang district. It covers the entire Thingbu and Mukto circles and parts of Tawang and Lumla circles.

Members of Legislative Assembly

Election results

2019

See also
 List of constituencies of Arunachal Pradesh Legislative Assembly
 Tawang district
 Arunachal Pradesh Legislative Assembly

References

Assembly constituencies of Arunachal Pradesh
Tawang district